A written language is the representation of a spoken or gestural language by means of a writing system. Written language is an invention in that it must be taught to children, who will pick up spoken language or sign language by exposure even if they are not formally instructed. Written languages can be formed by an alphabet, or using other writing systems to give words and graphical counterpart.

History 
The first writing can be dated back to the Neolithic era, with clay tablets being used to keep track of livestock and commodities. However, the first example of written language can be dated to Uruk, at the end of the 4th millennium BCE. An ancient Mesopotamian poem tells a tale about the invention of writing."Because the messenger's mouth was heavy and he couldn't repeat, the Lord of Kulaba patted some clay and put words on it, like a tablet. Until then, there had been no putting words on clay."

—Enmerkar and the Lord of Aratta, circa 1800 BCE.Scholars mark the difference between prehistory and history with the invention of the first written language. However, that leaves the argument of what is and isn't a written language. An argument over the transition of history to pre-history being whether a piece of writing in proto-writing, or genuine writing, making the matter largely subjective. Leaving the line in a gray-area. A general consensus is that writing is a method of recording information, composed of graphemes, which also may be glyphs, and it should represent some form of spoken language as well, falling hand in hand with containing information. Allowing numbers to be counted as writing as well.

Origins of writing 
Many thought writing originated in one civilization, the theory being called, "monogenesis." Scholars believing that all writing originated in ancient Mesopotamia, specifically in ancient Sumer, and then spread throughout the world from there.

Compared to spoken language

Written languages change more slowly than corresponding spoken languages. When at least one register of a language is strongly divergent from spoken language, the resulting situation is called diglossia. However, that is still often considered one language between literary language and other registers, especially if the writing system reflects its pronunciation.

Native readers and writers of English are often unaware that the complexities of English spelling make written English a somewhat artificial construct. The traditional spelling of English, at least for inherited words, preserves a late Middle English phonology that is never used as a speech dialect. The artificial preservation of that form of the language, in writing, might make much of what is now written intelligible to Geoffrey Chaucer (1343–1400) even if the medieval writer's speech could no longer be understood.

See also

 Graphocentrism
 Foreign language writing aid
 History of writing
 History of writing ancient numbers
 List of languages by first written accounts
 List of language disorders
 List of writing systems
 Literary language
 Standard language
 Text linguistics
 Writing

References

Further reading

Writing
Language varieties and styles